Leena Kaskela (née Rousek; 25 December 1939 in Turku - 2 December 2017 in Helsinki) was a Finnish news reporter on MTV3. She was awarded the Life Academy Award by the Finnish Television Academy in 2014.

References

1939 births
2017 deaths
Finnish television presenters
Finnish women television presenters
People from Turku